"A Thousand Years" is a song performed by Belgian singer-songwriter Tom Dice from his debut album Teardrops. It was released on 20 September 2010 as a digital download and on 3 January 2011 as a CD single. It peaked to number 44 on the Ultratop 50 chart in Belgium.

Track listing

Credits and personnel
 Lead vocals – Tom Dice
 Producer – Tom Dice, Tom Helsen
 Music – Tom Dice, Tom Helsen
 Lyrics –  Tom Dice
 Label: SonicAngel

Chart performance

Release history

References

2010 singles
Tom Dice songs
Songs written by Tom Dice
2010 songs